This is a list of Billboard magazine's ranking of the top country singles of 1969. "Daddy Sang Bass" by Johnny Cash was ranked as the year's No. 1 country single.

The ranking was based on performance on the Billboard Country Chart during the period from January 4, 1969, to August 30, 1969. Accordingly, the list excludes songs like "Okie from Muskogee", which held the No. 1 spot for four consecutive weeks from November 15 to December 6. And "A Boy Named Sue" ranks No. 83 on the list even though it held the No. 1 spot for five consecutive weeks from August 23 to September 20

See also
List of Hot Country Singles number ones of 1969
List of Billboard Hot 100 number ones of 1969
1969 in country music

Notes

References

1969 record charts
Billboard charts
1969 in American music